Gavdul may refer to:
 Gavdul, Ardabil
 Gavdul, East Azerbaijan
 Gavdul, Ilam
 Gavdul-e Gharbi Rural District
 Gavdul-e Markazi Rural District
 Gavdul-e Sharqi Rural District